Dasodis is a genus of moths belonging to the family Tortricidae.

Species
Dasodis cladographa Diakonoff, 1983
Dasodis microphthora (Meyrick, 1936)

See also
List of Tortricidae genera

References

External links
tortricidae.com

Tortricidae genera
Olethreutinae
Taxa named by Alexey Diakonoff